Gustmeyer is a surname. Notable people with the surname include: 

Carl Hieronimus Gustmeyer (1701–1756), Danish merchant
Catarina Gustmeyer (1710–1773), Danish businessperson, wife of Carl